Victor Efosa Uwaifo  (1 March 1941 – 28 August 2021) was a Nigerian musician, writer, sculptor, and musical instrument inventor, university lecturer, music legend, and the first Honorable Commissioner for Arts, Culture and Tourism in Nigeria. He was the winner of the first gold disc in Africa (Joromi) released in 1965 and seven other gold discs in Guitar boy, Arabade, Ekassa series and Akwete music. He recorded under the name "Victor Uwaifo and His Titibitis".

Early life and education
Victor Efosa Uwaifo was born in Benin City, Edo State, Colonial Nigeria and obtained his secondary school education at the Western Boys' High School Benin and St Gregory's College, Lagos, from 1957 to 1961. He began playing guitar when he was 12 years old, his earliest popular music influences being records of Spanish and Latin American music. He studied graphics at Yaba College of Technology, Lagos State and graduated in 1961–63 at the age of 22 years old.

He received a bachelor's degree with first-class honours at 54 years old (Valedictorian) and a master's degree from the University of Benin in 1997 at 56 where he studied fine and applied arts and majored in sculpture. The thesis for his PhD in architectural sculpture was entitled A reinvention of Benin Royal Ancestral Pieces, University of Benin, Nigeria.

Career 
After leaving Benin, Uwaifo continued playing music at St Gregory's College, Lagos. He was a contemporary of Segun Bucknor, and they were both among the leading Lagos high school bandleaders at the time. During school holidays and weekends, he jammed with Olaiya's All Stars band. After completing secondary school studies, he played with E.C. Arinze's highlife during late hours. Uwaifo also briefly worked with Stephen Osadebe and Fred Coker before he formed Melody Maestros in 1965. The band released "Joromi" which became a hit in Nigeria and other parts of West Africa. Uwaifo made history in Nigeria when he won the first golden record in Nigeria, West Africa and Africa (presented by Philips, West Africa) for his song "Joromi" in 1996.

Between 1965 and 1968, he developed the Akwete rhythm sound. In 1969, he launched a new beat called Shadow accompanied by a new dance also called shadow, a mixture of Akwete and twist. The sound was released when soul music was popular in Lagos and lasted a few years. After the launch of Shadow, the Melody Maestros went on tour of various Nigerian cities. Uwaifo later experimented with a new rhythm that was similar to soul but soon left it for Ekassa, an interpretation of a traditional Benin sound. In 1971, Uwaifo opened the Joromi Hotel in Benin City, and within ten years established his own television studio. From there, he produced a national weekly music and culture programme.

Uwaifo, who had a total of 12 golden records to date, travelled to many countries including the United States, Russia, Japan, United Kingdom, Bulgaria, Romania, Germany, France, Hungary, Rome, Ghana, Ivory Coast (Côte d'Ivoire), Togo, Benin Republic, Spain, and Canada.

National recognition

The Federal Government of Nigeria, in appreciation of his talents and contributions to Nigeria, honoured him with a National Honors Merit Award in 1983, which read in part:

" ... whereas you have been nominated and appointed as Member of the Order of the Niger to have and hold and enjoy the privileges of the Federal Republic of Nigeria of the said Order, MON."

Uwaifo was the first professional musician in Nigeria to receive such an award. He was a Justice of the Peace and had served in many capacities. Uwaifo was also appointed the Honorable Commissioner for Arts, Culture and Tourism and Member of the State Executive Council, the highest policy-making decision body in Edo State from 2001 to 2003.

Appointed Justice of Peace (JP), Public Notary and Lay Magistrate, Victor Uwaifo was honored by four Nigerian Presidents. He was awarded the National Honors of Nigeria (MON). He was invited to the State House by four Presidents and heads of state of Nigeria.

International recognition
In 1995, Uwaifo was invited by the United Nations Staff Day International Committee to perform during the UN Golden Jubilee celebration. He was cited in the Grove Dictionary of Music and Musicians, 1983 edition, documented in the "Who's Who in Nigeria", "Who's Who in Africa", "Who's Who in the Commonwealth", and "Men and Women of Distinction in the Commonwealth" sections. He was an Honorary Member of the Biographical Advisory Council, Cambridge, England; a member of both the Performing Right Society, and of the advisory board of American Heritage University, California, US. He was the first Nigerian to win a gold disc in Africa, (Joromi) released in 1965 at the age of 24 years old.

Business enterprises
Uwaifo was the Chairman of Joromi Organization, a multi-track recording and television studio in Benin City. He ran and managed an art gallery and the Victor Uwaifo Hall of Fame.

Personal life
Uwaifo's hobbies included swimming, bodybuilding, gaming, reading and writing. He was a Christian and married with children.

He was also a lecturer at the Department of Fine and Applied Arts at the University of Benin, Benin City, Edo State, Nigeria.

He died on 28 August 2021 at the age of 80.

Discography
Sir Victor Uwaifo Guitar Boy Superstar 1970-76 (2008, Soundway)
Contributing artist
 The Rough Guide to Highlife (2003, World Music Network)
 The Rough Guide To Psychedelic Africa (2012, World Music Network)
 The Rough Guide to African Disco (2013, World Music Network)

References

External links
 Victor Uwaifo website
 

1941 births
2021 deaths
Nigerian highlife musicians
Musicians from Benin City
Members of the Order of the Niger
20th-century Nigerian musicians
St Gregory's College, Lagos alumni
University of Benin (Nigeria) alumni
Yaba College of Technology alumni
20th-century Nigerian inventors
Academic staff of the University of Benin (Nigeria)
The Headies winners